Quzhou (衢州) is a modern prefecture-level city in Zhejiang, China. 

Quzhou may also refer to:
 Quzhou County (曲周), Hebei, China
 Quzhou (渠州), a former prefecture in roughly modern Qu County, Sichuan, China